Howard C. Nolan Jr. (born August 24, 1932) is an attorney and politician from New York who served in the New York State Senate from 1975 to 1994.

Biography
Nolan was born in Albany, New York on August 24, 1932.  He graduated from Christian Brothers Academy in Albany in 1950, the College of the Holy Cross in 1954, and Albany Law School in 1957.  Nolan was admitted to the bar in 1958 and served in the United States Marine Corps from 1957 to 1960, attaining the rank of First Lieutenant in the Judge Advocate Division.
After returning from the military Nolan practiced law in Albany, and later was a co-founder of Nolan & Heller, LLP.

A Democrat, in 1974 he was elected to the New York State Senate from the 42nd District.
Nolan was reelected every two years until 1992, and served from 1975 to 1994, sitting in the 181st, 182nd, 183rd, 184th, 185th, 186th, 187th, 188th, 189th and 190th New York State Legislatures. He did not run for reelection in 1994. In 1977, Nolan ran unsuccessfully for Mayor of Albany, losing the Democratic primary to longtime incumbent Erastus Corning 2nd.

A longtime civic activist, Nolan has served on the Board of Trustees for St. Peter’s Hospital.  He has also served on the Board of Directors for the State of New York Mortgage Agency, the Community Foundation for the Capital Region, and WMHT (TV).

Nolan has also been Chairman of the Board of the Cerebral Palsy Center for the Disabled Foundation, and is a member of the Marine Corps League, the Knights of Columbus, the Ancient Order of Hibernians, and the Albany Chamber of Commerce. In addition, he maintains an interest in horse racing, and is the owner of several thoroughbreds.

References
The New York Red Book, Volume 92.  1993.  Pages 151-152.
The Martindale-Hubbell Law Directory, Volumes 11-12.  1993.
Howard C. Nolan at New York Thoroughbred Breeding and Development Fund Board of Directors
Practicing Law at Troy Record, February 7, 1961
42nd Senate District Race at Troy Record, October 20, 1976
Erastus Corning 2d, Albany Mayor Since '42, Dies at New York Times.  May 29, 1983
Former Senator Howard Nolan’s Great Loves: Horses and Politics at The Saratogian, July 29, 2012

Living people
1932 births
College of the Holy Cross alumni
Albany Law School alumni
United States Marine Corps officers
New York (state) lawyers
Democratic Party New York (state) state senators
Politicians from Albany, New York
Lawyers from Albany, New York